Mrs. Sam Houston House is a historic house on Farm Road 390 in Independence, Texas. Sometimes known as the Root house, this Greek Revival house was built probably around 1855. Margaret Lea Houston, the widow of politician and Texas statesman Sam Houston, bought the house in 1864 from Major Eber Cave, a family friend. She lived in it during her final years until her death in 1867. The property was listed on the National Register of Historic Places in 1970 as the "Mrs. Sam Houston House," notable for its association with her.

See also

Sam Houston and slavery
List of the oldest buildings in Texas
National Register of Historic Places listings in Washington County, Texas
Recorded Texas Historic Landmarks in Washington County

References

External links

Houses on the National Register of Historic Places in Texas
National Register of Historic Places in Washington County, Texas
Houses completed in 1832
Houses in Washington County, Texas
Sam Houston
Recorded Texas Historic Landmarks